Robert M. Coleman (1793 – July 1, 1837) was a Texan and later American politician and soldier, aide-de-camp to Sam Houston; said to be his sober antithesis and the true hero of the republic. Coleman was a signer of the Texas Declaration of Independence, a Colonel, and a transitional founder of the Republic of Texas into the United States as a constituent state. His staid stance opposing the strategies of Sam Houston regarding defense of the Alamo, and troop placements on up through the Battle of San Jacinto caused a rift with Houston and a posturing treatise, lending suspicion to the untimely death of Coleman by drowning.

He was appointed one of the first Texas Rangers, whose outpost, Coleman's Fort, was later named Fort Colorado. The State Historic site marker now sits within Austin, Texas.

On February 1, 1858, he became the posthumous namesake of Coleman County, Texas and thus apparently also Coleman City, Coleman Lake, and eventually many other features, places, businesses, and identifiers in Coleman County.

Earlier writers on Coleman include Noah Smithwick, a contemporary frontiersman, stationed at Coleman's Fort, having an awareness of Coleman in Smithwick's book 'Recollections of old Texas Days'. The late Sherrianne Coleman Nicol, a possible relative or descendant, has written a detailed biography found in narrative-script form as of April 27, 2016, at Ancestry.com which suggests that Robert M. Coleman may have ancestral heritage from the often cited proposed Mobjack-Coleman lineage of colonial Virginia. Her article includes a substantial bibliography.

It is implied that his family's association with Sam Houston may have begun back in that Appalachian Virginia near Rockbridge Timber Plantation from where the Sam Houston family migrated. It is adjacent to a Coleman Mountain and Coleman Falls in southwest Amherst County and Nelson County where some of the Mobjack-Coleman lineage settled, both being typically Irish surnames.

Republic of Texas

The Texas Revolution
 
Many events followed a similar timeline to that of Sam Houston.

It has yet to be determined if any images exist with Sam Houston that might include the person of his aide-de-camp Robert M. Coleman.

Participant in the Republic of Texas
Coleman is not listed in the Old Three Hundred of the Stephen F. Austin contract with Spain, yet some of Robert's land references are noted within the Austin Colony. Coleman appears to have arrived in Texas as a part of the Robertson Empresario recruitment.

Settlement of Mina (now Bastrop, Texas)
Elected Alcalde (Mayor) in 1834. He was resident of Mina at the time he signed the Texas Declaration of Independence.

Author of war diary demeaning Sam Houston
Houston and his siding contingent denied the allegations of drunkenness and disregard for the safety of Texas troops. The distributed copies of Coleman's pamphlet are apparently rare to find in surviving form, and may have been burned or suppressed after his death.

Father and husband
Protector and defender against Apache and Comanche raids. The family took refuge in Coleman's Fort later known as Fort Colorado, near Austin, Texas. It is said that the Texas Rangers also made intrusions against certain tribes they considered detrimental to the Spanish and Mexican settlements.

Suspicious drowning
Coleman died in 1837 at Brazos River. He supposedly drowned, though there are suspicions of foul play (according to Nicol).

Memorial stone
A 1936 Memorial stone does not rule out one surviving child, Thomas Coleman, and/or apparent heirs, per Nicol. The State of Texas in 1936 issued a memorial stone which reads:

Site of the home ofCol. Robert M. Coleman
(1799-1837)signer of the Texas
Declaration of IndependenceAide-de-Camp to Gen. Houston at
San JacintoCommander of a Regiment of Rangers
1836-37here his widow
Mrs. Elizabeth Colemanand son Albert V. Coleman
were killed by Indiansand Thomas Coleman, aged five
was capturedFebruary 18, 1839

Erected by the State of Texas1936

See also
 Coleman County, Texas
 Battle of Concepción
 Texas Declaration of Independence
 Constitution of the Republic of Texas
 Texas Revolution
 Texas Republic
 Timeline of the Republic of Texas
 Old Three Hundred land transfers
 Spain land grants and caretakers

References

Bibliography
The following are general histories of Sam Houston (alphabetical by author), 
see Bibliographies in related links, external page sources, and other supporting evidence herein.
Additional details or references are welcome here (please note if Robert M. Coleman is mentioned or not).
 The Texas Revolution; Brinkley, William; Texas A&M Press: .
 Sword of San Jacinto, Marshall DeBruhl; Random House: .
 The Raven: A Biography of Sam Houston; James, Marquis; University of Texas Press: .
 The Eagle and the Raven; Michener, James A.; State House Press: .

Seeking
 references in any history of Mina (now Bastrop, Texas)
 references in any Waterloo (now Austin, Texas)
 references in any Christian County, Kentucky and or Hopkinsville, Kentucky

Further materials
 Awaiting any feedback from The Museum Library on the site of the Alamo regard Robert M. Coleman.
 Awaiting any feedback from The National Park Service on the site of San Jacinto National Battlefield regard Robert M. Coleman.
 A musical tune to the telling of Robert M. Coleman was written in 2015 by the historian known as The Professore.

External links
 Biography of Robert M. Coleman in the Texas Handbook Online published by the Texas State Historical Association.
 
 Stone memorial commemorating the Robert M. Coleman family as viewed at Find a Grave website.
 Said to be a photo of Robert M. Coleman as viewed at Find a Grave website. If correct, was photography available before his death in 1837, or was this derived from what etching or painting.
 Fort Colorado historical marker of Texas Texas Historical Commission site database regarding Marker Number 14229, Atlas Number 5507014229
 Description of Fort Coleman aka Fort Colorado Texas State Historical Association handbook online article about Coleman's Fort.

19th-century American politicians
American emigrants to Mexico
People of the Texas Revolution
1799 births
1837 deaths
Signers of the Texas Declaration of Independence